The second season of the American television comedy series How I Met Your Mother premiered on September 18, 2006 and concluded on May 14, 2007. It consisted of 22 episodes, each approximately 22 minutes in length. CBS broadcast the first three episodes of the second season on Monday nights at 8:30 pm in the United States, the remaining episodes were broadcast at 8:00pm. The complete second season was released on Region 1 DVD  on October 2, 2007. In the United Kingdom it aired on E4 from October 2, 2009 weekdays at 7:30pm.

Cast

Main cast
 Josh Radnor as Ted Mosby
 Jason Segel as Marshall Eriksen
 Cobie Smulders as Robin Scherbatsky
 Neil Patrick Harris as Barney Stinson
 Alyson Hannigan as Lily Aldrin
 Bob Saget (uncredited) as Future Ted Mosby (voice only)

Recurring cast
 Lyndsy Fonseca as Penny, Ted's Daughter
 David Henrie as Luke, Ted's Son
 Joe Nieves as Carl
 Charlene Amoia as Wendy the Waitress
 Joe Manganiello as Brad Morris
 Marshall Manesh as Ranjit

Guest cast
 Bryan Cranston as Hammond Druthers
 David Burtka as Scooter
 Bob Barker as himself
 Wayne Brady as James Stinson
 Michael Gross as Alfred Mosby
 Charles Robinson as Bank President
 Emmitt Smith as himself
 Lucy Hale as Katie Scherbatsky
 Ryan Pinkston as Kyle
 Candice King as Amy

Episodes

References

2
2006 American television seasons
2007 American television seasons